The following lists events that happened in 1940 in El Salvador.

Incumbents
President: Maximiliano Hernández Martínez 
Vice President: Vacant

Events

August
 30 August – España F.C., a Salvadoran football club, was established.

References

 
El Salvador
1940s in El Salvador
Years of the 20th century in El Salvador
El Salvador